The 2021–22 Navy Midshipmen men's basketball team represented the United States Naval Academy in the 2021–22 NCAA Division I men's basketball season. The Midshipmen, led by 11th-year head coach Ed DeChellis, played their home games at Alumni Hall in Annapolis, Maryland as members of the Patriot League.

Previous season
The Midshipmen finished the 2020–21 season 15–3, 12–1 in Patriot League play to finish as the South division champion. As the top seed in the Patriot League tournament, they were upset by #9 seed Loyola (MD) in the quarterfinals.

Roster

Schedule and results

|-
!colspan=12 style=| Non-conference regular season

|-
!colspan=12 style=| Patriot League regular season

|-
!colspan=9 style=| Patriot League tournament

Source

References

Navy Midshipmen men's basketball seasons
Navy Midshipmen
Navy Midshipmen men's basketball
Navy Midshipmen men's basketball